Dust Storm (Manter, Kansas) is a 3D digital simulation work of art, by John Gerrard.

History
In 2008, the Dust Storm was shown at Artropolis, Chicago.
In 2011, it was shown at PICA, Perth, Australia, Ivorypress, Madrid, Spain, and Irish Museum of Modern Art.

Analysis
The 3D "hyperreal" portraits depict beautiful landscapes.

References

External links
http://www.johngerrard.net/dust-storm-manter.html

Digital art